Operational Command West (OC West) is a formation of the Ukrainian Ground Forces in western Ukraine. Its headquarters is located in Rivne.

History 
When Ukraine gained independence from the Soviet Union, there were three Military Districts on its territory. These were the Kyiv, Odessa and Carpathian Military Districts. In 1998, the Western Operational Command was created from the Carpathian Military District.

By 1 July 2006, the Western Operational Command consisted of units directly subordinated to the command and to the 13th Army Corps.  These units were:
 7th Army Aviation Regiment
 11th Artillery Brigade
 15th Rocket Artillery Regiment
 14th Mechanized Brigade 
 24th Mechanized Brigade
 55th Communications Regiment
 80th Airmobile Regiment
 146th Reconnaissance and Command Center
 59th Artillery Regiment
 128th Mountain Infantry Brigade
 703rd Engineering Regiment
 704th Chemical Defense Regiment
In October 2013, Operational Command North was created in Rivne.  The Western Operational Command's headquarters was moved to Lviv and disbanded in August 2015. In November 2013, the 80th Airmobile Regiment was upgraded to brigade strength. From the beginning of 2015, Operational Command North was moved to Chernihiv. Operational Command West headquarters remained in Rivne. Major General Ihor Dovhan led the command from 2015.

In October 2015, the 10th Separate Mountain Assault Brigade was formed in the command. During late January and early February 2016, units of Operational Command West participated in joint training exercises with British instructors in Rivne.  On 5 February, the command was assigned responsibility for Ground Forces troops in Volyn, Zakarpattia, Ivano-Frankivsk, Lviv, Rivne, Ternopil, Khmelnytskyi, and Chernivtsi Oblasts. As of December of that year, it included the 10th Separate Mountain Assault Brigade, the 14th Separate Mechanized Brigade, 24th Separate Mechanized Brigade, 128th Separate Mountain Brigade, and 44th Separate Artillery Brigade. In March 2017, Major General Oleksandr Pavlyuk became commander of OC West after Dovhan was promoted to Deputy Commander of the Ground Forces for Combat Training.

Current Structure 

Operational Command West has operational command of ground force units in Volyn, Zakarpattia, Ivano-Frankivsk, Lviv, Rivne, Ternopil, Khmelnytskyi, and Chernivtsi oblasts.

 Operational Command West, Rivne
 10th Mountain Assault Brigade, Kolomyia
 14th Mechanized Brigade, Volodymyr
 24th Mechanized Brigade, Yavoriv
 128th Mountain Brigade, Mukachevo
 44th Artillery Brigade, Ternopil
 39th Anti-aircraft Missile Regiment, Volodymyr
 703rd Engineer Regiment, Sambir
 55th Signal Regiment, Rivne
 146th Maintenance Regiment, Zolochiv
 136th Reconnaissance Battalion, Rivne
 182nd Logistic Support Battalion, Berezhany
 224th Transport Battalion, Shepetivka
 394th Security & Service Battalion, Rivne
 146th Command & Intelligence Center, Rivne
 346th Information & Signal Center, Rivne
 Regional Radioelectronic Intelligence (REI) Center, Brody
 71st Maneuverable REI Center, Kovel
 84th REI Center, Vynohradiv
 99th REI Center, Serebriya
 201st Electronic Warfare Company, Rivne
 233rd Joint Training Range, Mala Lyubash

Additionally the following major ground combat formations of other branches of the Ukrainian Armed Forces, respectively the ground forces, are based in the area of Operational Command West:

 Ground Forces:
 19th Missile Brigade "Zaporizhia", in Khmelnytskyi
 12th Army Aviation Brigade, in Novyi Kalyniv
 16th Army Aviation Brigade, in Brody
 15th Rocket Artillery Regiment "Kyiv" (BM-30 Smerch), Drogobych
 Air Assault Forces:
 80th Air Assault Brigade, in Lviv
 Air Forces:
 11th Anti-aircraft Missile Regiment, in Shepetivka
 223rd Anti-aircraft Missile Regiment, in Stryi
 540th Anti-aircraft Missile Regiment, in Kamianka-Buzka
 Special Forces:
 8th Special Forces Regiment, in Khmelnytskyi
 Territorial Defense Forces
 100th Territorial Defense Brigade
 101st Territorial Defense Brigade
 102nd Territorial Defense Brigade
 103rd Territorial Defense Brigade
 104th Territorial Defense Brigade
 105th Territorial Defense Brigade
 106th Territorial Defense Brigade
 107th Territorial Defense Brigade

Commanders 
 Lieutenant General Valeriy Stepanov (1992)
 Colonel General Vasyl Sobkov (1993–1994)
 Colonel General Petro Shuliak (1994–1998)
 Colonel General Serhiy Chernilevsky (1998–1999)
 Colonel General Mykola Petruk (2003–2004)
 Lieutenant General Mykhailo Kutsyn (2004–2010)
 Major General Viktor Hanushchak (2010; acting)
 Lieutenant General Yuri Domanskii (2010 – May 2012)
 Lieutenant General Ihor Kolesnik (?-2015)
 Major General Ihor Dovhan (2015–March 2017)
 Major General Oleksandr Pavlyuk (March 2017–present)

References

External links 
 Official website

Military units and formations established in 1998
Military units and formations of Ukraine
West
1998 establishments in Ukraine